Samuel Urkato Kurke (born 1 September 1974) is an Ethiopian politician and cabinet minister since October 2018. He was president of Wolaita Sodo University before becoming Ministry of Mines and Petroleum and has been Minister of Science and Higher Education (MoSHE) since August 2020 until the ministry merge into Ministry of Education on 6 October 2021.

Background 
Samuel was born in Wolaita Sodo. He has a Bachelor of Arts in Economics from Hawassa University, Master of Arts in Economics (Development Policy Analysis) from Mekelle University, and attended a PhD exchange student program in Resource and Agricultural Economics at Kangwon National University, in South Korea. He attended a PhD exchange study at University of Massachusetts Boston in McCormack Graduate School of Policy and Global Studies, and completed his Doctor of Philosophy in the Addis Ababa University Department of Conflict Resolution, Human Security, and Global Governance.

Samuel became president of Wolaita Sodo University in 2016, before his direct nomination as Minister of Mines and Petroleum in October 2018 following national reform that held by Prime Minister Abiy Ahmed. On 18 August 2020, he became the Minister of Science and Higher Education following reshuffle of cabinet ministers.

See also 
 List of Ethiopian Politicians

References 

21st-century Ethiopian politicians
Ministers of Science and Higher Education
Wolayita
Ministers of Mines and Petroleum
Living people
1977 births
People from Wolayita Zone
Hawassa University alumni
Mekelle University alumni
Addis Ababa University alumni